This is a list of city chambers and town halls in Scotland. The list is sortable by building age and height and provides a link to the listing description where relevant.

See also 

 List of city and town halls

References

 
Scotland